Earle Page College is a residential college of the University of New England located in Armidale, New South Wales, Australia. The college accommodates roughly 300 students.

History 
The college is named after Dr Earle Christmas Grafton Page, who was the first Chancellor of the University of New England in 1954. It originated in 1963 as an all-male set of houses in town. Most Page students who were living in town had to travel to the campus for all meals by public transport. After its opening, students slowly moved into the current buildings. EPC began as an all-male college; however, females have been admitted since 1973.

Memorable college events 

1963 - Earle Page College was opened as a men's college
1967 - The motto of the college, "Each Prove Himself", was created.
1968 - First "Iskra" published.
1972 - A referendum was held in the college to decide whether the college should become a co-educational. The referendum was passed.
1973 - The first year women where admitted to college.
1981 - The last year freshers were required to do 'phone duty' from the single line entering college. The phone was operated by freshers who patched the calls to students on other floors. Later that year phones were installed on all floors.
1983 - The Ash Wednesday bushfires in Victoria for which some freshers did a 'wall sit' on their floor to raise money to send to victims.
1986 - Due to a huge intake for the University, over 100 students were housed in motels and hotels for most of first semester, and every available space in college was used - common rooms were separated into two section to house more members. The students living in town were brought to college for breakfast and dinner in buses, and paid the same amount as people living in college; Prime Minister Bob Hawke attended politics dinner.
1987 - D-Block, a block generally reserved for post grad students, overseas students and mature age students, was opened to the general college population.
1996 - Earle Page had so few residents they closed down D-Block for the year.
1997 - There was a bomb scare at Politics Dinner, which turned out to be a prank.
1999 - The College won both the Mary Bagnall and Presidents Trophy sporting competitions.
2001 - Two residents (Mary Jones & Tamar Scobie) were killed in a car accident in May and gardens in the main courtyard were built in their memory.
2003 - 40th Anniversary of Earle Page College.
2006 - College SCR member and former Pagite, Dr. Peter Hemphill, died. A memorial garden and plaque was dedicated to his memory and service to the college.
2007 - Earle Page College won the Mary Bagnall Trophy for only the second time in its history. The Annual College Ball was also moved out from the college grounds and held at the Armidale Ex-Services Club for the first time ever. The Annual Earle Page College Coast Run raised a record $30,000 for the Children's Medical Research Institute.
2008 - Earle Page College placed 1st in both the Sir Frank Kitto (SFK) and Mary Bagnall (MB) competitions, and places highly in the President's Trophy (PT) competition. Sam Loxton, of Don Bradman's 1948 Invincibles is the guest speaker at Sports Dinner, and Senator Bob Brown, leader of the Greens Party is the guest speaker at the annual Politics Dinner.
2009 - 30th anniversary of the Coast Run.
2013 - 50th anniversary of the College and 20th anniversary of the Coast Run Annual Fashion Parade extravaganza.
2020 - Apocalypse - When the College residents where sent home due to Covid an ungodly amount of beer was consumed
2020 - Murphys Return - When trimester 2 ended an ex college student returned named murphy he was 3 story's tall and could hold 6 beers.

College infrastructure 
The college is made up of 4 blocks, A, B, C & D blocks, with a total 10 floors. There is a Bot, Mid & Top floor on each block. There is not Bot B however, as this space is taken up by the laundries and other facilities. Bot D and Mid D are combined into one conglomerate floor known as MOD (Middle Od D). Each floor has its own bathrooms. Attached to the blocks include 2 laundries and drying rooms, an I.T. room, a gallery, a library, an exercise room and 2 music rooms. The college also has a dining hall, with a capacity for around 400, a BBQ area, a Junior Common Room, a Senior Common Room and a college shop run by students of the college.

When women were allowed into Page, all bathroom troughs were to be filled in, however, the men of Top D protested and placed their mattresses over the door to the bathroom, preventing the work from being completed. This is the last physical attribute of the college's all male heritage.

Pastoral and Academic Care 
Each floor on the college is run by a Resident Fellow, who is in charge of pastoral care, these Resident Fellows are there to help guide and care for all residents on the floor and the college. These Resident Fellows are selected by a Panel of Senior Residents and College Leaders.

There is also an Academic Mentor on each floor as well. Academic Mentors are there to help the floor with any academic issues that may arise, also to provide study workshops and insightful guides to a wide range of academic disciplines.

These two Committees are run by the Senior Resident Fellow and Senior Academic Mentor, along with the President of the Junior Common Room and the three main leaders of the College.

Inter-college competitions 
There are two main Inter-College competitions. The "Sir Frank Kitto" competition has events such as Debating, Public Speaking, Small Music Ensemble, Arts & Craft, Performance and Theatre Sports. The "Mary Bagnall" and "Presidents Trophy" competitions are the Inter-College sporting competitions. These competitions hold a range of spots throughout the year such as Rugby 7s, Swimming Carnival, Tennis, Netball, Football, Lawn Bowls, and Hockey.

In 2006, Earle Page came 2nd in the Sir Frank Kitto competition and received respectable placings in both the males' Presidents Trophy and females' Mary Bagnall Trophy. 
In 2008, Page came 1st in the Sir Frank Kitto competition and achieved 1st in the Mary Bagnall Trophy and 3rd in the Presidents Trophy. 
In 2012, Page achieved the trifecta taking out 1st place in the Sir Frank Kitto competition, President Trophy and Mary Bagnall Trophy.
Earle Page College has achieved 1st place in the Sir Frank Kitto competition for the previous 5 years.

SCR committee
The members of the Senior Common Room comprise non-resident academics, University employees, towns folk and Earle Page College Alumni who support the life of the college as a whole in a variety of ways, including academic, material, social and personal.

JCR committee 
The Junior Common Room Committee is the peak student body, elected directly by the college residents. The committee operates through the payment of a subscription fee paid by most students, which subsidises college functions, pays for PT and MB sports, SFK competitions and an annual major project.

Positions held on the JCR committee are, President , Vice-President, Secretary, Treasurer, Media and Publications Officer, Health and Well-being Officer, Events Officer (Oliver William Whitelaw-Swift), External Officer, JCR Officer (Finley Lloyd Cooney), Sound Officer. As well as two Fresher representatives and the illustrious honorary position of Rave Cave Manager (Jesse Streeting)

Formal dinners and JCR functions 
Yearly formal dinners include:
Introductory Dinner
Arts Dinner
Politics Dinner and Lecture
Parents Dinner
Sporties Dinner
Valedictory Dinner

Guests at the Politics Lecture have included several prime ministers, senators, MPS and political authorities, People such as Hon. Bob Hawke, John Howard, Julia Gillard, Tony Abbott, Penny Wong, Peter Garrett, Amanda Vanstone, Philip Ruddock, Natasha Stott Despoja, Angus "Ashy" Ashford and Sarah Hanson-Young have all spoken at the lecture.

Functions run by the Junior Common Room Committee include:
Cab Ball
Annual College Ball
Block Functions
Silly Season (Term 3)

The Junior Common Room Committee runs several events in O-Week which include: Aussie Night, Games Night, Trivia Night, Toga Party, Bush Dance and Surf Carnival.

Activities

Musical
Every year since 1973, EPC has produced a musical over a 3 night period during Parents Weekend. The musical is completely run by the residents and the elected Musical Committee.

Past 10 years of Earle Page College Productions 
2016 - The Adams Family
2015 - Grease
2014 - Into The Woods
2013 - Sweeney Todd: The Demon Barber on Fleet Street 
2012 - Return to The Forbidden Planet
2011 - Little Shop of Horrors 
2010 - Beauty and the Beast 
2009 - Rent
2008 - Something Happened on the way to the Forum
2007 - 'Bye 'Bye Birdie
2006 - How to Succeed in Business Without Really Trying

Coast run 
Every year since 1980 the college has conducted a charity run from Armidale to Coffs Harbour (220 km) to raise funds for charity, the Children's Medical Research Institute (CMRI). 
The Fundraising activities include the sale of a Discount Card for use within Armidale, an Annual Fashion Extravaganza, Charity Auction, Inter-floor sports, Coast Run Goes Bush a fun run around the UNE campus, and the run itself. In 2005, the group raised over $23,500 with the introduction of the Charity Discount Card. In 2006, its 27th year, the group raised over $25,000, which was a record for the event. In 2007 this record was broken, with over $30,000 raised over the entire year, and again broken in 2008 with over $35, 000 raised. In 2010, the committee raised $45,000.

In all over $400,000 has been raised for Children's Medical Research by this means.

Masters 

1963–1975 - Albert Bussell
1976–1979 - Dr. Edmund Barrington Thomas
1979–1988 - Allan Keith Huggins
1989–1991 - Carole Tisdell
1992–1994 - Phillip Raymont
1995–1999 - Gregory Eddy
1999–2010 - David Ward
2010–2011 - Andrea Gledhill
2012–2014 - Penny Biddle
2014–2015 - Jasmine Galletly
2015–2020 - Kathie Hunt
2021-Present - Brody Goodman

References

External links 
  of Earle Page College

Residential colleges of the University of New England (Australia)